Joseon Attorney is an upcoming South Korean television series starring Woo Do-hwan, Bona, and Cha Hak-yeon. It is scheduled for release on MBC TV on March 31, 2023, and will aired every Friday and Saturday at 21:50 (KST). It will also available for streaming on Wavve in selected regions.

Synopsis
The series is about a foreign branch (attorney) who takes revenge on the enemy who killed his parents through trial.

Cast

Main
 Woo Do-hwan as Kang Han-soo: a foreign branch (attorney) with demonic charm.
 Bona as Lee Yeon-joo: a princess who sincerely cares about the country and its people. She is a woman of misfortune who faces an unattainable love while hiding her identity.
 Cha Hak-yeon as Yoo Ji-sun: Yeon-joo's fiancée, who is a judge of Hanseongbu and the third generation of readers from the most prestigious family in Joseon.

Supporting

People in the Palace
 Song Geon-hee as Seongjong of Joseon / Lee Hyul (personal name): The king of Joseon who dreams of strengthening his royal authority and establishing a state of law.
 Kim Ae-ran as Grand Queen Dowager Jaseong: Lee Hyul's grandmother.
 Han Sang-jo as Eunuch Go: Lee Hyul's right-hand man.

Ministers of Government
 Chun Ho-jin as Minister of Military Taxation Yoo Je-se: Ji-sun's father who has absolute power who monopolizes wealth and power.
 Choi Moo-sung as Choo Young-woo: the Right Chamchan
 Lee Jae-woon as Won Dae-han: the Left Chamchan
 Choi Byung-mo as Im Sang-ho: the Right State Councilor
 Nam Kyung-eup as Choi Soo-yong: the Left State Councilor

People around Kang Han-soo
 Lee Kyu-sung as Dong-chi: Han-soo's best friend and colleague, who has crush on Kang Eun-soo for a long time.
 Joo Ah as O-wol: a new gisaeng at Wolharu.
 Yoo Ye-bin as Jong-hyang: a gisaeng at Wolharu.
 Han So-eun as Kang Eun-soo: Han-soo's older sister.
 Kim Jong-tae as Kang Eon-jik: Han-soo's father.
 Min Ji-ah as Mrs. Lee: Han-soo's mother.

People around Lee Yeon-joo
 Shin Dong-mi as Lady Hong: Yeon-joo's nanny and the owner of Sowongak guesthouse.
 Lee Si-hoo as Choi Yoon: Lady Hong's nephew.
 Kim Do-yeon as Chef Baek: current chef in Sowongak.
 Han Min as the former king: Yeon-joo's father and Lee Hyul's uncle.

People around Yoo Ji-sun
 Kang Hyun-oh as Kim Ji-ho: Ji-sun's bodyguard.

Others
 Lee Jun-hyeok as Jang Dae-bang: a former police officer
 Hong Wan-pyo as Jo Cheol-joo: Dae-bang's loyal limbs.
 Lee Chan-jong as Chu-sal: Dae-bang's limbs.

Extended
 Lee Tae-gum as Lee Bang
 Hwang Man-ik as Heo Pan-yoon: the highest official of Hanseong-bu.

References

External links 
  
 
 

MBC TV television dramas
Korean-language television shows
Television series set in the Joseon dynasty
2023 South Korean television series debuts
Upcoming television series
South Korean historical television series
South Korean action television series